Events from the year 1850 in Denmark.

Incumbents
 Monarch – Frederick VII
 Prime minister – Adam Wilhelm Moltke

Events

 30 March – All Danish Gold Coast Settlements are sold to Britain and incorporated into the British Gold Coast
 16 July: The Danish army moves into Slesvig.

Undated
 March 30 – Denmark sells the Danish Gold Coast to the United Kingdom

Culture
 5 March [ Hans Christian Andersen's poem Danmark, mit fædreland is published in the newspaper Fædrelandet.
 8 May  Hans Christian Andersen's Danmark, mit fædreland is first time performed publically as a sking by a men's choir to a melody by Christian Rung at a concert arranged by the Scandinavian Society in the Casino Theatre in Copenhagen to raise money for a monument commemorating the Danish victory in the Battle of Fredericia.

Births
 22 June – Frants Henningsen, painter (died 1908)
 27 June – Jørgen Pedersen Gram, mathematician (died 1916)
 10 July  Valdemar Gætje, master baker and the first director of the Union of Danish Employers and Master Craftsmen (died 1905)

Deaths
 20 January – Adam Oehlenschläger, poet (born 1779)
 9 May – Princess Juliane Sophie of Denmark, princess of Denmark (born 1788.
 12 May – Nicolai Abraham Holten, banker and civil servant (born 1775)

Full date missing
 Thomas Jacobsen, violin maker (born 1810)

References

Extermal links

 
1850s in Denmark
Denmark
Years of the 19th century in Denmark